Clinton James Fynes Clinton (13 December 1792 – 13 April 1833) was a British barrister and Tory politician who served as Member of Parliament for Aldborough from 1826 to 1832. He assumed the additional surname of Clinton by Royal licence in 1821.

He was the brother of the classical scholar and MP Henry Fynes Clinton.

References 

 

1792 births
1833 deaths
Conservative Party (UK) MPs for English constituencies
Members of the Parliament of the United Kingdom for English constituencies
People educated at Westminster School, London
Alumni of Christ Church, Oxford
Members of Lincoln's Inn
English barristers